Nagel is a German and Dutch surname. Meaning "nail" in both languages, the surname is metonymic referring to the occupation of a nail maker. Notable people with the surname include:

Aaron Nagel, American painter and musician
Alexander Nagel (born 1945), American mathematician
Anne Nagel (1915–1966), American motion picture actress
Bill Nagel (1915–1981), American baseball player
Björn Nagel (born 1978), German-Ukrainian equestrian
Carsten Nagel (born 1955), Danish writer
Charles Nagel (1849–1940), American politician and lawyer
Christiaan Nagel (born 1982), South African-born British street artist
Christian Heinrich von Nagel (1803–1882), German mathematician
Conrad Nagel (1897–1970), American actor and matinee idol
David Nagel (born c. 1945), American executive
De-Wet Nagel (born 1985), South African actor, musician and composer
Dolf van der Nagel (1889–1949), Dutch footballer
Ernest Nagel (1901–1985), American philosopher of science
Gerd Nagel (born 1957), West German high jumper
Heike Nagel (born 1946), West German swimmer
Ivan Nagel (1931–2002), German theater scholar, critic and director
Jan Nagel (born 1939), Dutch Labour Party politician
Jan Nagel (painter) (c. 1560–1602), Dutch Renaissance painter
Jennifer Nagel (born 1947), Canadian philosopher
Judy Nagel (born 1951), American alpine skier
Lisle Nagel (1905–1971), Australian cricketer, twin-brother of Vernon
Maggy Nagel (born 1957), Luxembourgish politician
Melanie von Nagel (1908–2006), American-German writer; American Roman Catholic nun
Morné Nagel (born 1978), South African sprinter
Otto Nagel (1894–1967), German painter
Patrick Nagel (1945–1984), American artist
Paul C. Nagel (1926–2011), American historian and biographer
Ray Nagel (1927–2015), American college football coach
Rodica Nagel (born 1970), French-Romanian long-distance runner
Sidney R. Nagel (born 1948), American physicist
Simon Nagel (born 1985), Danish footballer
Steven R. Nagel (1946–2014), American astronaut
Stuart Nagel (1934–2001), American political scientist
Thomas Nagel (born 1937), American philosopher
Tilman Nagel (born 1942), German Orientalist
Vernon Nagel (1905–1974), Australian cricketer, twin-brother of Lisle
Volbrecht Nagel (1867–1921), German missionary to the Malabar coast of India

See also
Nagl
Nagle
Magel

References

German-language surnames
Dutch-language surnames
Occupational surnames